Kevin Kennedy  (born Kevin Patrick Williams, 4 September 1961) is an English actor and musician, best known for playing the character Curly Watts for 20 years in ITV's long-running television soap opera Coronation Street.

Early life
Kennedy was born in Wythenshawe, Manchester. He attended St. Paul's Catholic High School and was a keen member of Manchester Youth Theatre. Kennedy later studied drama at Manchester Polytechnic.

Career
Kennedy was in the band the Paris Valentinos with Johnny Marr and Andy Rourke.

Between 1983 and 2003, Kennedy played the character of Norman "Curly" Watts in the TV soap Coronation Street. Among other jobs, the character started as a paperboy, then became a dustman, and was later an assistant manager at a supermarket. The character had two marriages, producing two children; one from each wife. After a short break from acting whilst recovering from an alcohol addiction in 2000, he released a single, "Bulldog Nation", with his band the Bunch of Thieves, on the RCA Records label. The single peaked at No. 70 on the UK Singles Chart.

He returned to Coronation Street a few months later, before being written out permanently in September 2003. In an interview in 2009, Kennedy said that he would consider a return to the show and it was later confirmed that he would film scenes for its fiftieth anniversary DVD. However, more than a decade after his departure, he has yet to make a return. Kennedy was the writer and producer of the 2005 television series Spanish Capers. A second series was recorded in 2006–2007 for BSkyB.

In 2009, Kennedy played the part of aging hippie "Pop" in the touring production of Queen & Ben Elton's We Will Rock You before joining the cast of the West End London production in 2010. In 2015, Kennedy was asked to be involved with the launch of the world's third-largest cruise liner "RCI Anthem of the Seas" appearing in a West End production of "We Will Rock You".  He has appeared many times on board as Pop; most recently in the UK Seacation cruises from Southampton in summer 2021.

He also appeared in the 2009 "Scent from Heaven?" advert for Daz, as part of the company's "Cleaner Close" campaign. In 2010, Kennedy, along with several other Coronation Street stars, contributed to Trisha Ward's album Rogues, Angels, Heroes and Fools, recorded for the fiftieth anniversary of the soap. In 2017, he played Graham Ollerinshaw, a David Bowie tribute act, in an episode of the BBC's Holby City.

In 2019, he appeared in Cinderella at Cambridge Arts Theatre.

He played an angel in the Christmas episode of Mrs Brown's Boys on 25 December 2019.

Personal life
Kennedy is married and has three children. He serves as director of Kennedy Street recovery services, a social enterprise, with his wife Clare, the Brighton-based organisation's CEO, offering free telephone advice, signposting to local recovery services, home-based detox, various recovery focused programmes and a professional advice and coaching service to the business sector.

Credits

Acting

Albums

References

External links

Alumni of Manchester Metropolitan University
1961 births
Living people
English pop guitarists
English male guitarists
Male actors from Manchester
Musicians from Manchester
English writers
English film producers
English people of Irish descent
English male soap opera actors